Roycea is a genus of plants formerly in the family Chenopodiaceae, and now in the Amaranthaceae. The genus was first described in 1948 by Charles Austin Gardner, and the genus name honours Robert Dunlop Royce (a helper at the Perth Herbarium). The entire genus is endemic to Western Australia. There are no synonyms.

Species
(listed by both Plants of the World online, and FloraBase.)

Roycea divaricata Paul G.Wilson
Roycea pycnophylloides C.A.Gardner
Roycea spinescens C.A.Gardner

References

 
Eudicots of Western Australia
Taxa named by Charles Gardner
Amaranthaceae genera